Eastern Zonal Council is a zonal council that comprises the states of  Bihar, Jharkhand, Odisha, Sikkim and West Bengal.

The States have been grouped into six zones having an Advisory Council to foster cooperation among these States. Five Zonal Councils were set up vide Part-III of the States Reorganisation Act, 1956.

See also
 Northern Zonal Council
 North-Eastern Zonal Council
 Central Zonal Council
 Western Zonal Council
 Southern Zonal Council

References

Zonal Councils